The 43rd Parliament of Ontario was elected in the 2022 Ontario general election.

Members

Front benches 

 Ford Ministry

List of members

Membership changes

Seating plan

Note: Bold text designates the party leader.

References

External links 

 Legislative Assembly of Ontario.

Terms of the Legislative Assembly of Ontario
2022 establishments in Ontario
2022 in Canadian politics
2022 in Ontario